Syzygium cumini, commonly known as Malabar plum, Java plum, black plum, jamun, jaman, jambul, or jambolan, is an evergreen tropical tree in the flowering plant family Myrtaceae, and favored for its fruit, timber, and ornamental value. It is native to the Indian subcontinent, adjoining regions of Southeast Asia, including Myanmar, Sri Lanka, and the Andaman Islands. A rapidly growing plant, it is considered an invasive species in many world regions.

The name of the fruit, black plum, is sometimes mistranslated as blackberry, which is a different fruit in an unrelated order. Syzygium cumini has been introduced to areas including islands of the Pacific and Indian Oceans, Australia, Hong Kong and Singapore.

The tree was introduced to Florida in 1911 by the United States Department of Agriculture, and is commonly grown in tropical and subtropical regions worldwide. Its fruits are eaten by various native birds and small mammals, such as jackals, civets, and fruit bats.

Description

Its dense foliage provides shade and is grown just for its ornamental value. At the base of the tree, the bark is rough and dark grey, becoming lighter grey and smoother higher up. The wood is water resistant after being kiln-dried. Because of this, it is used in railway sleepers and to install motors in wells. It is sometimes used to make cheap furniture and village dwellings, though it is relatively hard for carpentry.

The leaves which have an aroma similar to turpentine, are pinkish when young, changing to a leathery, glossy dark green with a yellow midrib as they mature.  The leaves are used as food for livestock, as they have good nutritional value.

Syzygium cumini trees start flowering from March to April. The fruits develop by May or June and resemble large berries; the fruit of Syzygium species is described as "drupaceous". The fruit is oblong, ovoid. Unripe fruit looks green. As it matures, its color changes to pink, then to shining crimson red and finally to black color. A variant of the tree produces white coloured fruit. The fruit has a combination of sweet, mildly sour and astringent flavour and tends to colour the tongue purple.

Invasive species
This species is considered invasive in Florida, South Africa, parts of the Caribbean, several islands of Oceania, and Hawaii.

Culinary uses
Jambolan fruits have a sweet or slightly acidic flavor, are eaten raw, and may be made into sauces or jam. Inferior fruits may be made into juice, jelly, sorbet, syrup, or fruit salad.

Nutrition
Raw fruit is 83% water, 16% carbohydrates, 1% protein, and contains negligible fat. In a 100 gram reference amount, the raw fruit provides 60 calories, a moderate content of vitamin C, and no other micronutrients in appreciable amounts (table).

History
The 1889 book 'The Useful Native Plants of Australia’ records that the plant was referred to as "durobbi" by Indigenous Australians, and that "The fruit is much eaten by the natives of India; in appearance it resembles a damson, has a harsh but sweetish flavour, somewhat astringent and acid. It is eaten by birds, and is a favourite food of the flying fox (Brandis)." The fruit has been used in traditional medicine.

Cultural and religious significance in India

In the Majjhima Nikāya, three parallel texts (MN 36, MN 85 and MN 100) claim that the Buddha remembered an experience of sitting in the cool shade of a jambu tree when he was a child. While his father was working, he entered into a meditative state which he later understood to be the first stage of Jhāna meditation. The texts claim that this was a formative experience, which later encouraged him to explore and practise Jhāna meditation, and that this then led to his Awakening. The Pāli word jambu is understood by Pāli dictionaries to refer to the Syzygium cumini which they often translate as the Rose-apple tree.

Krishna was said to have four symbols of the jambu fruit on his right foot as mentioned in the Srimad Bhagavatam commentary (verse 10.30.25), "Sri Rupa Chintamani" and "Ananda Candrika" by Srila Visvanatha Chakravarti Thakura.

In Maharashtra, Syzygium cumini leaves are used in marriage pandal decorations. A song from the 1977 film Jait Re Jait mentions the fruit in the song "Jambhul Piklya Zaadakhali".

Besides the fruits, wood from  tree (as it is called in the region's language, Telugu) is used in Andhra Pradesh to make bullock cart wheels and other agricultural equipment.

Legend in Tamil Nadu speaks of Avvaiyar (also Auvaiyar or Auvayar) of the Sangam period and the jamun fruit, called  in Tamil. Avvaiyar, believing to have achieved everything that is to be achieved, is said to have been pondering over her retirement from Tamil literary work while resting under  tree. There she was met with and was wittily jousted by a disguised Murugan, regarded as one of the guardian deities of Tamil language, who later revealed himself and made her realize that there is still a lot more to be done and learnt.

Gallery

See also
Duhat wine
Jambudvipa

References

External links
 
 

cumini
Medicinal plants
Trees of the Indian subcontinent
Trees of Indo-China
Trees of Malesia
Flora of Queensland
Tropical fruit
Fruit trees